DNA-directed RNA polymerases I, II, and III subunit RPABC5 is a protein that in humans is encoded by the POLR2L gene.

Function 

This gene encodes a subunit of RNA polymerase II, the polymerase responsible for synthesizing messenger RNA in eukaryotes. The product of this gene contains four conserved cysteines characteristic of an atypical zinc-binding domain. Like its counterpart in yeast, this subunit may be shared by the other two DNA-directed RNA polymerases.

Interactions 

POLR2L has been shown to interact with POLR2C, POLR2A, POLR2B and POLR2E.

References

Further reading